Red Mountain is located in the southeast corner of Washington state near the Tri-Cities between Rattlesnake Mountain and Candy Mountain. This region is situated among the Columbia, Snake and Yakima Rivers.

Red Mountain AVA, Washington's smallest wine region appellation, is situated on the south-facing slope of Red Mountain, between the cities of Benton City and West Richland within the larger Yakima Valley. About 700 of the area's  are planted to winegrapes, which mainly include Cabernet Sauvignon, Merlot, Cabernet franc, Syrah and Sangiovese. The area is home to 37 wineries.

In 2001, the federal government recognized the Red Mountain area as an official American Viticultural Area. Some of Washington's top estates are sourcing grapes from the Red Mountain AVA. The sandy loam soil  of the region is high in calcium and alkaline. Red Mountain's vineyards are characterized by good air drainage, light soils and deeply rooted vines. Red Mountain's growing season averages 180 days.

Nearby cities and towns
Benton City, Kennewick, Pasco, Prosser, Richland, West Richland.

References

Mountains of Benton County, Washington
Tri-Cities, Washington
Mountains of Washington (state)